Cordner is a surname. Notable people with the surname include:

Alan Cordner (1890–1915), Australian rules footballer
Boyd Cordner (born 1992), Australian professional rugby league player
Christopher Cordner (born 1949), Australian philosopher
Denis Cordner (1924–1990), Australian rules football player
Don Cordner (1922–2009), Australian rules footballer
Douglas Cordner (1887–1946), Irish cricketer
Edward Cordner (born 1887), Australian rules footballer
Harry Cordner (1885–1943), Australian rules footballer
Jock Cordner (born 1910), Australian rules footballer
John Cordner (politician) (1816–1894), first Unitarian minister in Canada
John Cordner (sportsman) (born 1929), Australian sportsman
Laurence Cordner (1911–1992), Australian sportsman
Michael Cordner, academic, author and specialist in theatre and drama
Robert Cordner (born 1932), Canadian sprint canoeist
Ted Cordner (1919–1996), Australian rules footballer

See also
Cordner–Eggleston Cup, historic private school Australian rules football competition
Alexander and Nellie P. Cordner House, historic Victorian Eclectic house in Orem, Utah
Cordner–Calder House, built in 1894 by William Cordner in Orem, Utah
William James and Edna Cordner House, built c.1898 in Orem, Utah
Corder (disambiguation)
Corner (disambiguation)